Qoloub Tahta Ramad (Arabic: قلوب تحت الرماد ; English: Hearts under the ashes) is an Algerian television soap opera directed by Bachir Sellami. Broadcast from 6 June to 5 July 2016, the show aired on the channel A3 on Télévision Algérienne. The show aired during Ramadan, the month of fasting and religious observance in Islam.

Premise 
The series tells the story of two families who had friendly relations and familiarity, but after the divorce between the spouses in one of the families, the problems arise, the events develop dramatically and show conflicts and psychological contract, doubles the suffering of the divorced couple's daughters. The father was forced to take care of his daughters and their care after the mother left them for many years. After the girls grew up, the mother returns and tries to retrieve them by force, influence and money.

Cast 
 Sara Lalama
 Bahia Rachedi
 Rania Serroti
 Mostafa Laaribi

References 

2010s Algerian television series
2016 Algerian television series debuts
2016 Algerian television series endings
Arabic-language television shows
Television series about families
Television series about marriage
Television shows filmed in Algeria
2010s television soap operas
Public Establishment of Television original programming